Kadłubiska may refer to the following places:
Kadłubiska, Hrubieszów County in Lublin Voivodeship (east Poland)
Kadłubiska, Zamość County in Lublin Voivodeship (east Poland)
Kadłubiska, Subcarpathian Voivodeship (south-east Poland)
Luchkivtsi in Brodivskyi Raion, Lviv Oblast, in western Ukraine, was formerly known as Kadłubiska.